Mosteller is a surname of German origin. People with this surname include:

Frederick Mosteller (1916 – 2006), American statistician
Parris Mosteller (born 2001), American child actor
Sue Mosteller (born 1933), Canadian writer
Brian Mosteller (born 1975), Director of Oval Office Operations

Music
Carrollton (band), formerly named Mosteller

Surnames of German origin
German-language surnames